Qinhuangdao Olympic Sports Center Stadium served as one of the soccer venues during the 2008 Summer Olympics.

The multiuse stadium, which is used mostly for soccer matches, lies inside the Qinhuangdao Olympic Sports Center on the Hebei Avenue in Qinhuangdao, China.

Its construction was started in May 2002 and completed on July 30, 2004.

References
Beijing2008.cn profile
Qinhuangdao Sports website 

Football venues in China
Athletics (track and field) venues in China
Venues of the 2008 Summer Olympics
Olympic football venues
Sports venues in Hebei
Sports venues completed in 2004
Buildings and structures in Qinhuangdao
Sport in Qinhuangdao